Malamore is a 1982 Italian melodrama film co-written and directed by Eriprando Visconti and starring Nathalie Nell and Jimmy Briscoe. It was Visconti's last film. It premiered at the 39th edition of the Venice International Film Festival in the De Sica section.

Plot
Friuli, autumn of 1917. The dwarf Marcello Giammarco, the only son of a wealthy lawyer, is held by his father confined in a majestic country villa near Palmanova. The villa is located in the Italian rear of the front and has been partially converted into a military hospital.
In this unreal atmosphere, between servants and dying, which precedes the defeat of Caporetto, the courteous and dignified Marcello tries to lead a normal existence, pursuing the sentimental dream of bonding with Maria, a prostitute of the local brothel.
The death of his father, accidentally hit by an artillery shell during the capture of Palmanova, invests Marcello with responsibility for the great family heritage, while his villa, where he continues to live, becomes the seat of an Austrian rear command. Even the brothel changes customs and customers: now all Austrian soldiers.
In those moments of extreme social and moral uncertainty, Marcello's rich patrimony becomes a possible target and a hope of revenge for some neglected, maneuvered by a shrewd profiteer, from whom the war seems to have taken away any future and any ethical sense.

Cast
 Jimmy Briscoe as Marcello Giammarco
 Nathalie Nell as Maria
 Antonio Marsina as Cesare
 Remo Girone as The Monk
 Elisabeth Kaza as Leni Grundt 	
 Leopoldo Trieste as The Administrator 
 Leonardo Treviglio as Amilcare
 David Brandon as Major Banfield (credited as David Aughton)
 Cesare Barbetti 
 Monica Scattini as Sonia 
 Serena Grandi as A Prostitute
 Cinzia Cavalieri as Alma
 Fiorella Molinari as Flora 
 Maurizio Donadoni  
 Ettore Geri

Production
The film was mainly funded by the director Eriprando Visconti. The first choice for the Maria's role was Giuliana De Sio, but the distributors rejected the idea because at the time they considered De Sio just as a television actress. Edwige Fenech was also offered the role but refused.

Reception
The film was both a critical and commercial failure.

See also 
 List of Italian films of 1982

References

External links

Italian romantic drama films
1982 romantic drama films
1982 films
Films directed by Eriprando Visconti
Films set in 1917
Melodrama films
1980s Italian-language films
1980s Italian films